Aisyah: Biarkan Kami Bersaudara is a 2016 Indonesian film produced by Film One Productions and directed by Herwin Novianto. The film was about a Muslim women who become teacher in a Catholic village. Shooting location was on Atambua, East Nusa Tenggara. The film starred Laudya Cynthia Bella, Lidya Kandau, Arie Kriting, and Ge Pamungkas. The film was premiered on mid-May 2016.

References 

2016 films
Indonesian drama films
2010s Indonesian-language films